ISO 3166-2:GE is the entry for Georgia in ISO 3166-2, part of the ISO 3166 standard published by the International Organization for Standardization (ISO), which defines codes for the names of the principal subdivisions (e.g., provinces or states) of all countries coded in ISO 3166-1.

Currently for Georgia, ISO 3166-2 codes are defined for 2 autonomous republics, 1 city, and 9 regions. The city Tbilisi is the capital of the country and has special status equal to the regions.

Each code consists of two parts, separated by a hyphen. The second part is two letters.

Current codes
Subdivision names are listed as in the ISO 3166-2 standard published by the ISO 3166 Maintenance Agency (ISO 3166/MA).

Click on the button in the header to sort each column.

 Notes

Changes
The following changes to the entry have been announced in newsletters by the ISO 3166/MA since the first publication of ISO 3166-2 in 1998:

Codes before Newsletter I-2

See also
 Subdivisions of Georgia
 FIPS region codes of Georgia

External links
 ISO Online Browsing Platform: GE
 Regions of Georgia, Statoids.com
 Districts of Georgia, Statoids.com

2:GE
ISO 3166-2
Georgia (country) geography-related lists